Kosmos 690 (in Russian: Бион 2, Космос 690), or Bion 2, was a Bion satellite launched by the Soviet Union.

Launch 
Kosmos 690 was launched on 22 October 1974, at 17:59:59 UTC from Plesetsk Cosmodrome with a Soyuz-U launch vehicle.

Spacecraft 
The spacecraft was based on the Zenit spy satellite with emphasis on studying the problems of radiation effects on human beings.

It carried albino rats for biomedical research. Scientists from Czechoslovakia, Romania and Soviet Union subjected the rats to daily radiation doses from a gamma source by ground command. When they were recovered 21 days later, many rats had developed lung problems and their blood and bone marrow had changed more than those of control specimens.

Outwardly, ball valves with compressed nitrogen are attached to the gas nozzles of the stabilizer system. At the rear, the TDU-1 braking engine is located at a stroke of 15.83 kN and a maximum operating time of 45 seconds. Hypergolic KPL delivers a turbo pump to the combustion chamber.

Mission 
After 21 days, Kosmos 690 returned to Earth and landing in Kazakhstan on 12 November 1974.

See also 

 1974 in spaceflight
 Kosmos (satellite)

References

Bibliography 
 Kozlov, D. I. (1996), Mashnostroenie, ed.; Konstruirovanie avtomaticheskikh kosmicheskikh apparatov, Moscow, ISBN
 Melnik, T. G. (1997), Nauka, ed.; Voenno-Kosmicheskiy Sili, Moscow. ISBN
 "Bion' nuzhen lyudyam", Novosti Kosmonavtiki (6): 35, 1996

Bion satellites
Kosmos satellites
Spacecraft launched in 1974
1974 in spaceflight
1974 in the Soviet Union
Romania–Soviet Union relations
Czechoslovakia–Soviet Union relations